Lyngngam is an Austroasiatic language of Northeast India closely related to Khasi language. Once listed as a dialect of Khasi, Lyngngam has in recent literature been classified as a distinct language. Lyngngam speakers have food and dress similar to the neighboring Garo people.

Phonology

Consonant inventory
The following table lists the consonants attested in Lyngngam.
{| class="wikitable" style="text-align: center;"
|-
! colspan = "2" |  
! Bilabial
! Alveolar
! Palatal
! Velar
! Glottal
|-
! colspan = "2" | Nasal
| 
| 
| 
| 
|  
|-
! rowspan = "3" | Stop
! voiceless
| 
| 
| 
| 
| 
|-
! aspirated
| 
| 
| 
| 
|  
|-
! voiced
| 
| 
| 
| 
|  
|-
! colspan = "2" | Voiceless fricative
|  
| 
|  
|  
| 
|-
! colspan = "2" | Liquid
|  
| 
|  
|  
|  
|-
! colspan = "2" | Glide
| 
|  
| 
|  
|  
|}
The main difference with the Khasi language is that Lyngngam does not possess the voiced aspirated series. Furthermore, Lyngngam does not have the phoneme .
{| class="wikitable" style="text-align: center;"
|-
! Lyngngam
! Khasi
! meaning
|-
| 
| 
| bone
|-
| 
| 
| 10
|-
| 
| 
| hair
|-
| 
| 
| chisel
|}

Vowel inventory
The following table lists the vowel inventory of the language.
{| class="wikitable" style="text-align: center;"
|-
!  
! Frontunrounded
! Centralunrounded
! Backrounded
|-
! High
| 
| 
| 
|-
! Mid
| 
| 
| 
|-
! Low
| colspan="3" | 
|}

Words with diphthongs in Khasi have monophthongs in Lyngngam, as in the following pairs of cognates:
{| class="wikitable" style="text-align: center;"
|-
! Lyngngam
! Khasi
! meaning
|-
| 
| 
| month
|-
| 
| 
| dog
|-
| 
| 
| night
|}

References

 

Khasian languages
Languages of India
Languages of Meghalaya